"Weight of Love" is a song by American rock band The Black Keys. It was released as the fifth single from their eighth studio album Turn Blue on January 27, 2015, and is the opening track on the album.

The video for "Weight of Love" was directed by Theo Wenner. It starred Lara Stone.

Charts

References

2015 singles
The Black Keys songs
2014 songs
Songs written by Dan Auerbach
Songs written by Patrick Carney
Songs written by Danger Mouse (musician)